The 2012 Rochford Council election took place on 3 May 2012 to elect members of the Rochford Council in England. They were held on the same day as other United Kingdom elections.

References

2012 English local elections
2012
2010s in Essex